Cuong Vu Trio Meets Pat Metheny is a studio album by Vietnamese jazz trumpeter Cuong Vu and American jazz guitarist Pat Metheny, with additional musicians Stomu Takeishi on fretless five-string bass guitar, and Ted Poor on drums. The album was released on May 6, 2016 via Nonesuch label.

Vu had previously been a member of the Pat Metheny Group for two albums and tours before this recording.

Reception

The AllMusic review by Matt Collar states "Together, the quartet plays a set of original songs that straddle the line between ambient tone poems, exploratory modal jazz, and punk-inflected noise jams". They also selected it as one of their Favorite Jazz Albums of 2016. In The Jazz Mann Ian Mann wrote "This is music that sounds fresh, spontaneous and adventurous but still with enough structure and compositional awareness to appeal to most discerning listeners". Writing for The Guardian John Fordham observed "Metheny enters completely into the exploratory spirit, and gives Vu’s intriguing music a fresh dimension and creative support".

Track listing

Personnel
 Pat Metheny – guitar
 Cuong Vu – trumpet
 Stomu Takeishi – fretless bass guitar
 Ted Poor – drums

References

2016 albums
Instrumental albums
Pat Metheny albums
Nonesuch Records albums